Duhok Governorate is a governorate in the autonomous Kurdistan Region of Iraq. Its capital is the city of Duhok. It includes Zakho, near the Ibrahim Khalil border crossing with Şırnak Province, Turkey. It borders the Al-Hasakah Governorate of Syria. Before 1969, it was part of Nineveh Governorate, which was called Mosul Governorate. The estimated population in 2018 was 1,292,535.

Demographics 
Duhok Governorate is mainly populated by Kurds with an Arab, Assyrian, and Armenian minority. Historically, there was a Jewish population in the region as well. The main religious groups are Muslims, Yazidis and Christians.

Government
Governor: Ali Tatar Nerweyi
Deputy Governor: Majid Sayid Salih
Governorate Council Chairman (PCC): Fehim Abdullah
41 total seats
33 seats for the Kurdistan Democratic Party (KDP)
4 seats for the Patriotic Union of Kurdistan (PUK)
4 seats for the Kurdistan Islamic Union (KIU)

Districts

Duhok Governorate is divided into seven districts, four of which are officially part of Kurdistan Region, while three others are under de facto control of the Kurdistan Regional Government:

 Amedi District
 Duhok District
 Semel District
 Zakho District
 Akre District (Disputed)
 Bardarash District (Disputed)
 Shekhan District (Disputed)

Villages and towns
 Araden
 Avzrog
 Badarash
 Bakhetme
 Bamarni
 Bebadeyy
 Dehi
 Dawodiya
 Duhok
 Harmash
 Hezany
 Khanke
 Sarsink
 Sharmin
 Sharya
 Surya
 Zawita

See also 
2011 Duhok riots
Duhok international airport

References

 
Governorates of Iraq
Assyrian geography
Geography of Iraqi Kurdistan
Upper Mesopotamia
1976 establishments in Iraq
States and territories established in 1975